Altötting is an electoral constituency (German: Wahlkreis) represented in the Bundestag. It elects one member via first-past-the-post voting. Under the current constituency numbering system, it is designated as constituency 212. It is located in southern Bavaria, comprising the districts of Altötting and Mühldorf.

Altötting was created for the inaugural 1949 federal election. Since 2002, it has been represented by Stephan Mayer of the Christian Social Union (CSU).

Geography
Altötting is located in southern Bavaria. As of the 2021 federal election, it comprises the districts of     Altötting and Mühldorf.

History
Altötting was created in 1949. In the 1949 election, it was Bavaria constituency 1 in the numbering system. In the 1953 through 1961 elections, it was number 196. In the 1965 through 1976 elections, it was number 200. In the 1980 through 1998 elections, it was number 199. In the 2002 election, it was number 215. In the 2005 election, it was number 214. In the 2009 and 2013 elections, it was number 213. Since the 2017 election, it has been number 212.

Originally, the constituency comprised the districts of Altötting, Mühldorf, and Wasserburg am Inn. In the 1976 election, it comprised the districts of Altötting, Mühldorf, and Erding. In the 1980 through 1994 elections, it comprised the districts of Altötting, Mühldorf, and Ebersberg. In the 1998 and 2002 elections, it comprised the districts of Altötting (excluding the Verwaltungsgemeinschaft of Kirchweidach), Mühldorf, and Ebersberg. It acquired its current borders in the 2005 election.

Members
The constituency has been held by the Christian Social Union of Bavaria  (CSU) during all but one Bundestag term since its creation. It was first represented by Georg Mayerhofer of the Bavaria Party (BP) from 1949 to 1953. Josef Bauer of the CSU was elected in 1953 and served until 1969. Valentin Dasch then served a single term. Karl-Heinz Spilker was representative from 1972 to 1994, followed by Josef Hollerith from 1994 to 2002. Stephan Mayer was elected in 2002, and re-elected in 2005, 2009, 2013, 2017, and 2021.

Election results

2021 election

2017 election

2013 election

2009 election

Notes

References

Federal electoral districts in Bavaria
1949 establishments in West Germany
Constituencies established in 1949
Altötting (district)
Mühldorf (district)